The 2010 season for the  cycling team began in January with the Grand Prix d'Ouverture La Marseillaise. As they did in their inaugural season in 2009, the team competes in 2010 as a UCI Professional Continental team with wildcard status, meaning they are eligible to be invited to any UCI ProTour event. The team's manager is Hilaire Van Der Schueren.

The team's biggest acquisitions for the 2010 season are Feillu brothers, both of them minor stars from a recent Tour de France while riding for Agritubel. Romain, the elder, wore the yellow jersey for a day in 2008, while younger brother Brice won a stage in 2009.

2010 roster 
Ages as of January 1, 2010

Riders who joined the team for the 2010 season

Riders who left the team during or after the 2009 season

One-day races

Spring classics
The team opened its season at the Grand Prix d'Ouverture La Marseillaise. The squad for this event was chosen in December; Hoogerland was the leader, trying to improve upon a fifth-place finish in this race in 2009. Westra figured into the morning's breakaway, along with Jussi Veikkanen and Julien El Fares, and nearly managed to stay away, being caught with only a few kilometers left in the race's final climb. A selection was made among the 85-strong peloton that had caught Westra and Veikkanen, with six, including Hoogerland, contesting an uphill sprint finish. Hoogerland finished second behind 's Jonathan Hivert. Traksel won Kuurne–Brussels–Kuurne, on the first weekend of the traditional spring classics season, in brutally bad weather. Of the 198 riders who began the race, just 26 finished, as the rain and the cold combined with the hilly parcours to make for what was called the most difficult day of racing in the last seven years. Traksel outsprinted two breakaway companions, Ian Stannard and Rick Flens, for the win. Vacansoleil had had van Groen in first position on the road when Traksel made his eventually race-winning attack. Van Der Schueren told Traksel to drop back, yet the stocky Dutchman continued to ride away. Though happy to have won, he referred to the attack as "stupid" when asked after the race.

The team also raced Omloop Het Nieuwsblad and the Clásica de Almería.

Fall races

Stage races
Vacansoleil's first stage race of the season was the Étoile de Bessèges. The first stage ended in a mass sprint, won by Božič after the team overpowered ' leadout train. Božič followed it up with a similar win the next day. In February, Mol won the Tour of Qatar overall by figuring into a crucial stage 2 breakaway. He did not win any stage.

The team also sent squads to the Tour of Oman, the Tour Méditerranéen, the Volta ao Algarve, and the Ruta Del Sol.

Grand Tours
The team did not receive invitations to either the Giro d'Italia or the Tour de France, despite the fact that both start in the Netherlands. It remains to be seen whether they will be invited to the Vuelta a España.

Season victories

Footnotes

References

2010 road cycling season by team
Vacansoleil–DCM
2010 in Dutch sport